is a scholarly study group created by the governments of Japan and China.  It is made up of prominent historians from both countries.

History
In 2006, the Chinese and Japanese foreign ministers agreed to create a joint study group to try to find ways to clarify interpretations of history which are notably different.  This agreement recognized that disputes about history have affected bilateral relations.

The first meeting was held in December 2006 at the Chinese Academy of Social Sciences in Beijing, with committee members meeting with Li Zhaoxing, Minister for Foreign Affairs of the People's Republic of China.  The historians developed China-Japan joint study topics.

Disputes
Many areas of dispute were not resolved -- for  example, in the final report,
  "the Japanese insisted that Ryukyu was under effective control of the Satsuma domain from the 17th century and that this fact was known to China, while the Chinese persevered that Ryukyu was an independent state until 1879, when Ryukyu was annexed by Japan."

List

Japanese members
 Sumio Hatano
 Yoshiaki Kawamoto
 Hideaki Kikuchi
 Shinichi Kitaoka, chairman
 Tomoyuki Kojima
 Tsuyoshi Kojima
 Kazuya Sakamoto
 Junichiro Shoji
 Kazuyuki Tsuruma
 Masayuki Yamauchi

Chinese members
 Bu Ping, chairman
 Jiang Lifeng
 Rong Weimu
 Tang Chongnan
 Tao Wenzhao
 Wang Jianlang
 Wang Xiaoqiu
 Wang Xinsheng
 Xu Yong 
 Zang Yunhu

References

Historiography of China
China–Japan relations
Historiography of Japan